Fredrik "Fred" Zachariasen (1931–1999) was an American theoretical physicist, known for his collaborative work with Murray Gell-Mann, Sidney Drell, and others.

Early life and education

Fredrik Zachariasen was born in 1931 in Chicago, Illinois. His father was the physicist William Houlder Zachariasen.

Fredrik Zachariasen graduated in 1951 with BS in physics from the University of Chicago and in January 1956 with PhD from Caltech with thesis Photodisintegration of the deuteron. He was a postdoc from 1955 to 1956 at MIT, from 1956 to 1957 at the University of California, Berkeley, and from 1957 to 1958 at Stanford University, where he was an assistant professor from 1958 to 1960.

Career
In 1960 he joined the faculty of Caltech and remained there until he retired in September 1999 as professor emeritus. In 1960 he was a Sloan Research Fellow.

He was a founding member of the JASON Defense Advisory Group, where he worked with Walter Munk on acoustic detection of submarines.

Ball-Baker-Zachariasen (BBZ) formulation

Later life and legacy
Fredrik Zachariasen's wife Nancy worked as a staff member at the library at the California Institute of Technology. They had two daughters. He died in 1999 in Pasadena, California.

Zachariasen's papers are held in the collection of the California Institute of Technology.

Selected publications
 with Sidney Drell: 
 with David Horn: 
 with Roger F. Dashen, Walter H. Munk, and Kenneth M. Watson:  2010 pbk reprint

References

20th-century American physicists
University of Chicago alumni
California Institute of Technology alumni
California Institute of Technology faculty
Members of JASON (advisory group)
1931 births
1999 deaths